The Clerk of the Australian Senate is the head of the Parliamentary Department of the Senate, which is the parliamentary department supporting the work of the Australian Senate. The Clerk is responsible to the President of the Senate who in turn is responsible for the department to the Senate. The Department of the Senate  is not part of the Executive Government of Australia. The current Clerk is Richard Pye. The Deputy Clerk of the Senate is Jackie Morris. Since 1999, the terms of the Clerk of the Senate, as that of the Clerk of the House of Representatives, have been limited to 10 years. The change did not apply to the incumbents.

The Department of the Senate provides advice and support to the Senate, its committees, the President of the Senate and senators. The Clerk is directly responsible for: 

 provision of procedural and constitutional advice to senators in respect of the operations of the Senate and its committees.
 provision of secretariat, advisory and administrative support to the Procedure Committee and the Committee of Privileges.
 production, amendment and updating of Odgers' Australian Senate Practice.
 production and dissemination of material relating to the work of the Senate and its committees to the widest possible audience.
 corporate leadership of the Department of the Senate.
 secretariat services for the Inter-Parliamentary Union.

In addition, the office exercises overall responsibility for, and quality control of, all procedural and administrative activities of the department.

Clerks of the Senate 

The longest-serving Clerk was Harry Evans, who served 21 years, from 1988 to 2009.

See also 
 Clerk of the Australian House of Representatives

External links
 Official website of the Australian Senate

Clerk of the Senate
Australian Senate
Australian Senate